Neocalamites is an extinct genus of Sphenophytes. Neocalamites, thrived during the Permian and Triassic, and occurs on localities from both hemispheres.

Description
Sizes ranged from few centimetres to two meters tall and the free leaves occurred at the nodes of the aerial stems. It is supposed that they produced secondary tissues as Calamites, but had bractless cones similar to Equisetum. There are indications that this plant lived in humid places along rivers and shores of lakes.

Location of sites
 Fairly intact fossils have been found in Tasmania.
 Australia
 Various localities in Southern Germany
 Argentina
 Brazil, in Paleorrota geopark.
 China

References

Horsetails
Prehistoric plant genera
Permian first appearances
Middle Jurassic extinctions
Fossils of Germany
Kupferschiefer